The 2019 Torneig Internacional de Tennis Femení Solgironès was a professional tennis tournament played on outdoor clay courts. It was the fourth edition of the tournament which was part of the 2019 ITF Women's World Tennis Tour. It took place in La Bisbal d'Empordà, Spain between 13 and 19 May 2019.

Singles main-draw entrants

Seeds

 1 Rankings are as of 6 May 2019.

Other entrants
The following players received wildcards into the singles main draw:
  Eva Guerrero Álvarez
  Claudia Hoste Ferrer
  Sabine Lisicki
  Renata Zarazúa

The following players received entry by special exempts:
  Nadia Podoroska
  Daniela Seguel

The following players received entry from the qualifying draw:
  Naiktha Bains
  Mirjam Björklund
  Dalma Gálfi
  Francesca Jones
  Marta Kostyuk
  Rosa Vicens Mas

Champions

Singles

 Wang Xiyu def.  Dalma Gálfi, 4–6, 6–3, 6–2

Doubles

 Arina Rodionova /  Storm Sanders def.  Dalma Gálfi /  Georgina García Pérez, 6–4, 6–4

References

External links
 2019 Torneig Internacional de Tennis Femení Solgironès at ITFtennis.com
 Official website

2019 ITF Women's World Tennis Tour
2019 in Spanish sport